Naseem Shafaie (born 1952) is a Kashmiri language poet who writes about a variety of topics including the turbulent atmosphere of Kashmir from a woman's perspective.

Early life and education
Shafaie was born in a middle-class family in Srinagar. She has a post-graduate degree in Kashmiri language and literature from the University of Kashmir and is a teacher of Kashmiri language at a graduate level.

Literary career
Shafaie has published two poetry collections. Derche Machrith  (Open Windows) was published in 1999. Her second collection Na Thsay Na Aks (Neither Shadow Nor Reflection, 2009) won the 2011 Sahitya Akademi Award for Kashmiri making Shafaie the first Kashmiri woman to win the prize. Na Thsay Na Aks was also among the eight winners of the inaugural Tagore Literature Award in 2009. Her poetry has been translated into English, Urdu, Kannada, Tamil, Marathi and Telugu.

Awards and recognitions
 Sahitya Akademi Award
 Tagore Award

Bibliography
 2009 :- Na Tschai Na Aks (Neither Shadow Nor Reflections)
 1999 :- Derche Machrith (Open Windows)

See also
 Kashmiri poetry
 Sahitya Akademi Award
 Mohammad Zahid

References

Kashmiri poets
Living people
1952 births
People from Srinagar
University of Kashmir alumni
Recipients of the Sahitya Akademi Award in Kashmiri
Jibanananda Das Award